Amberlihisar is an Ottoman fortress located in Trabzon, Turkey. It was built by Mehmed the Conqueror in 1466 as a defense against the Aq Qoyunlu (also known as the White Sheep Turkomans).

The fortress, which is situated on a hill overlooking the city of Trabzon, is a testament to the military might of the Ottoman Empire. It is a large, imposing structure, with high walls and numerous towers and bastions. The fortress also has a number of underground tunnels and chambers, which were used as storage areas and as a means of escape in case of attack.

In addition to its military functions, Amberlihisar also played a role in the cultural life of Trabzon. It was home to a number of important officials and dignitaries, and it was also a center of learning and scholarship.

There is a legend about a princess who lived in Amberlihisar. According to the legend, the princess was a beautiful and talented young woman who was renowned for her beauty and her skills in music and poetry. She was said to have spent her days in the fortress, composing poems and playing her lute, and many people came from far and wide to hear her music and admire her beauty.

Despite its historical and cultural importance, Amberlihisar is not as well known as some other Ottoman landmarks, such as the Topkapi Palace or the Blue Mosque. However, it remains an important and fascinating piece of Ottoman history, and it is well worth a visit for anyone interested in the rich cultural heritage of Turkey.

Name 
The name of Amberlihisar fortress is thought to have derived from the legend of the princess who lived within its walls. According to local folklore, the princess had a room adorned with the beautiful golden-hued stone known as amber. It is believed that the fortress was named for the presence of this legendary princess and her amber-filled chamber. The word "hissar," meanwhile, is a Turkish word meaning "fortress," and was commonly used in the Ottoman Empire to refer to military strongholds and defensive structures. Thus, the name Amberlihisar can be literally translated as "fortress with amber", reflecting both the legend of the princess and the fortress's role as a defensive structure.

Construction 

Amberlihisar fortress was built in 1466 by Mehmed the Conqueror in Trabzon, Turkey. The fortress was designed by Armenian architect, Ostad Krikor Baghsarajian.
Construction of the fortress was completed using a combination of stone and brick materials, with craftsmen and builders being brought in from the Rumelia region to work on the project. The timbery for the fortress was sourced from the forests along the coast of the Black Sea. The duration of construction is not specified, but it is known that the fortress was completed in 1466. It is likely that construction took several years to complete.

In terms of style, Amberlihisar fortress was similar to European castles of the time, with thick walls and a layout designed for defense. Construction techniques used in the building of the fortress likely included the use of mortar and other traditional building methods.

Amberlihisar fortress was built on a hill, offering a strategic vantage point and providing an additional layer of defense. The fortress was located near a river, and the moat surrounding the fortress was filled with water from the river. This provided an additional line of defense against potential attackers. The hilltop location of the fortress also allowed for views of the surrounding landscape and made it easier to spot potential threats from a distance. The combination of the fortress's location, moat, and thick walls made it a formidable defensive structure. 

Overall, the construction of Amberlihisar fortress was a complex and time-consuming process, requiring the expertise of skilled craftsmen and the use of a variety of materials and techniques. The finished product was a formidable and impressive structure that served as a valuable defensive structure for many years.

1536 Safavid siege 

In 1536, the Safavid forces launched a small-scale siege on Amberlihisar fortress, utilizing cannons in their attack. However, the siege was quickly ended in an Ottoman victory due to the arrival of relief forces sent by the Ottoman central government, who also made use of cannons in their defense of the fortress. The timely arrival of these forces helped to strengthen the Ottoman defense and ultimately led to their victory against the Safavid attackers. Despite the relatively small scale of this particular siege, it demonstrated the importance of Amberlihisar fortress in the Ottoman defense system and the commitment of the central government to its protection.

After the successful defense of Amberlihisar fortress against the Safavid forces in 1536, the Ottoman military and government took steps to further strengthen the fortress and protect it from future attacks. These measures likely included repairs to any damage sustained during the siege, as well as the implementation of additional defensive structures and technologies such as cannons. The Ottoman authorities increased the number of troops stationed at the fortress and enhanced their training and readiness. These efforts were likely undertaken in order to ensure that Amberlihisar fortress remained a formidable and impenetrable defense against potential adversaries.

19th century modernization efforts 

In the 19th century, the Ottoman Empire faced a number of threats, including the expanding influence of Russia. In response to these threats, the Ottoman government implemented a number of modernization efforts in order to strengthen its defenses and maintain its military superiority.

As part of these efforts, the Ottoman military sought to modernize and fortify key defensive structures, including Amberlihisar fortress. In the mid-19th century, with the help of French military officers and architects, two modern bastions were added to the fortress. These bastions were constructed using a combination of brick and stone materials and were designed to be resistant to artillery fire.

The addition of these modern bastions to Amberlihisar fortress helped to enhance the Ottoman defense system and further protect the region from potential threats. The use of skilled foreign professionals and the incorporation of modern materials and techniques in the construction of the bastions reflected the Ottoman Empire's commitment to modernization and its desire to maintain its military strength in the face of an increasingly complex and volatile international landscape.

Russian officer Captain Ivan Petrovich was greatly impressed by Amberlihisar fortress during his visit in the 19th century. In his personal notes, he wrote: "I have had the opportunity to visit many fortresses in my career, but I must say that Amberlihisar is one of the most formidable and well-constructed I have seen. Its walls are thick and strong, and the addition of the new bastions has further enhanced its ability to withstand attack. It is clear that a great deal of thought and effort has gone into the design and construction of this fortress. I have no doubt that it would be a terrifying obstacle for any enemy seeking to attack Trabzon." Captain Petrovich's observations highlight the effectiveness of Amberlihisar fortress as a defense against external threats.

1877-78 Russian siege 

During the Ottoman-Russian War of 1877-1878, Amberlihisar fortress played a crucial role in successfully defending against the Russian advance. The fortress, under the command of Ottoman military commanders İçelli Selim Pasha, was able to withstand a lengthy siege by Russian forces. The Russian siege of Amberlihisar fortress began in July 1877 and lasted for approximately six months. The Russian forces employed a variety of tactics during the siege, including the heavy use of artillery and the sapping technique, in an attempt to breach the fortress walls. However, the Ottoman defenders were able to hold out until February 1878, when the Russian forces were finally forced to lift the siege and withdraw.

Turkish hussars routinely carried out a small-scale attacks against Russian support troops in an effort to disrupt their logistical supply lines. According to accounts of the battle, the hussars, under the personal command of Selim Pasha, launched a surprise attack on the Russian encampment in the dead of night. The element of surprise, combined with the effectiveness of the light cavalry in skirmishes, allowed the Ottoman forces to inflict significant damage on the Russian rear troops and disrupt their supply lines. The attack was a tactical success for the Ottoman Empire, and helped to weaken the Russian position in the region.

Russian historian Mikhail Minorsky, writing about the Ottoman-Russian War of 1877-1878, described the role of Amberlihisar fortress as follows: "The defense of Amberlihisar fortress [...] was of the utmost importance in hindering the Russian military operations in Trabzon. The bravery and determination of the Ottoman defenders, combined with the fortress's strong defensive structures, allowed the Ottoman Empire to hold out against the Russian siege for six months."

In addition to its military function, Amberlihisar fortress also served as a refuge for the local Muslim population during the conflict. Many civilians, fleeing the violence and destruction of the war, sought shelter within the fortress walls. The Ottoman authorities, recognizing the importance of protecting the civilian population, took steps to ensure the safety and well-being of these refugees.

Garrison composition
During the Ottoman period, Amberlihisar fortress was guarded by a mixed garrison comprising both local troops and janissaries. The janissaries, an elite military corps directly loyal to the central government, were responsible for guarding the inner castle, while local troops were responsible for defending the outer castle. The fortress was also home to azeb class troops, who were responsible for various auxiliary duties such as construction and logistics. With a capacity to accommodate 500-750 troops on a regular basis and 2500-3000 in times of war, Amberlihisar was capable of withstanding prolonged sieges.

In the 19th century, with the abolition of the janissary corps and the introduction of the new model regular army (nizamı cedid), the composition of the garrison at Amberlihisar changed. The nizamı cedid troops, trained in modern military techniques and equipped with modern weapons and ammunition, replaced the janissaries as the primary defenders of the fortress.

The weapons and ammunition used by the troops at Amberlihisar included muskets, cannons, and various types of explosives. The fortress also contained an armory, where these weapons and other military supplies were stored. The armory was a vital component of the fortress's defensive capabilities, ensuring that the garrison had a ready supply of weapons and ammunition to use in the event of an attack.

Social and cultural life
Amberlihisar fortress not only served as a defensive structure, but it was also a hub of cultural and social activity during the Ottoman period. The fortress was home to a diverse population, including soldiers and their families, as well as local merchants and artisans. The presence of these various groups within the fortress walls contributed to a rich and vibrant cultural life.

In addition to the cultural activity within the fortress itself, the surrounding area was also home to a number of cultural and social events and activities. The fortress was located in close proximity to the city of Trabzon, which was known for its vibrant cultural scene. The region was also home to a number of religious and historical sites, which attracted visitors from throughout the Ottoman Empire and beyond. As such, Amberlihisar fortress and its surrounding area were integral parts of the cultural and social fabric of the region during the Ottoman period.

Decay and restoration 
During World War I, Amberlihisar fortress sustained significant damages as a result of bombardment by Russian forces. These damages included damage to the fortress walls, as well as the destruction of buildings and other structures within the fortress.

As Turkish commander Kazım Karabekir surveyed the ruins of Amberlihisar fortress in 1920, he was overcome with emotion: "The sight of these shattered walls, once a bastion of Ottoman strength and power, fills me with a sense of profound loss. How easily the grandeur of empires crumbles, laid low by the relentless march of time and the devastation of war. And yet, even in ruin, the fortress stands as a witness to the indomitable spirit of the Ottoman people. We must remember the past, but look to the future, and rebuild that which has been destroyed. For though the winds of change may blow fierce, the foundations of our nation will endure."

In the 2000s, efforts were undertaken to repair and restore the fortress, which had fallen into disrepair in the years following World War I. These restoration efforts included the repair and rebuilding of damaged structures, as well as the implementation of measures to preserve and protect the fortress for future generations. The completion of these restoration efforts has helped to ensure that Amberlihisar fortress remains a prominent and well-preserved historical site in the region.

Footnotes

References 

Ottoman fortifications
15th-century fortifications
Mehmed the Conqueror
1466 in the Ottoman Empire
History of Trabzon
Buildings and structures in Trabzon